Game Plan or The Game Plan may refer to:

 The Game Plan (film), a 2007 comedy starring Dwayne "The Rock" Johnson
 Game Plan, a Singapore Chinese drama series
 "The Game Plan" (The O.C.), an episode of The O.C.
 Game Plan (company), a defunct American pinball machine manufacturer
 The Game Plan, a sports programme centred on Australian rules football, first screened in 2011
 The Game Plan, a sports programme centred on rugby league football, first screened in 2011
 Game Plan, a Filipino sports program
 "Game Plan", an episode of He-Man and the Masters of the Universe
GamePlan, a 2001 play by Alan Ayckbourn